Karina Uzurova (born 25 January 1997) is a Kazakhstani former ice dancer. With Ilias Ali, she competed in the final segment at two ISU Championships and finished sixth at the 2015 Winter Universiade.

Personal life 
Uzurova was born on 25 January 1997 in Almaty. She studied at the Kazakh Academy of Sport and Tourism in Almaty. She is the daughter of ice dancing coach Kuralay Uzurova.

Career 
Uzurova began learning to skate as a six-year-old, in 2003. She teamed up with Ilias Ali in November 2009. The two made their international debut in September 2010, competing at 2010–11 ISU Junior Grand Prix events in Braşov, Romania, and Karuizawa, Japan. In March, they competed at the 2011 World Junior Championships in Gangneung, South Korea. Ranked 7th in the preliminary round and 17th in the short dance, they qualified to the final segment and went on to finish 17th overall. During the season, they trained in Almaty, Kazakhstan, and Odintsovo, Russia, coached by Kuralay Uzurova and Alexei Gorshkov.

In the 2011–12 ISU Junior Grand Prix season, Uzurova/Ali placed 7th in Riga, Latvia, and 15th in Gdańsk, Poland. In January, they competed at the 2012 Winter Youth Olympics in Innsbruck, Austria; they ranked fifth in the short dance, sixth in the free dance, and sixth overall. The following month, at the 2012 World Junior Championships in Minsk (Belarus), they placed 11th in the preliminary round and 22nd in the short dance, which meant that they did not qualify to the free dance. They were coached by Uzurova and Gorshkov until the end of the season.

Competing in the 2012–13 ISU Junior Grand Prix series, Uzurova/Ali placed 10th in Bled, Slovenia, and 7th in Zagreb, Croatia. Kuralay Uzurova and Maia Usova served as their coaches. The skaters made no international appearances the following season due to Ali's injury.

In 2014, Uzurova/Ali began training in Bloomfield Hills, Michigan, coached by Anjelika Krylova, Pasquale Camerlengo, and Natalia Deller. Making their senior international debut, the duo finished 7th at the 2014 CS Golden Spin of Zagreb in December. In February, they placed 5th in the short dance, 8th in the free dance, and 6th overall at the 2015 Winter Universiade in Granada, Spain. A week later, they competed at their final event together, the 2015 Four Continents Championships in Seoul, South Korea, where they finished 12th.

The following season, Uzurova briefly competed with Canada's Aaron Chapplain, placing 11th at the 2015 CS Tallinn Trophy in November. The two were coached by Krylova, Camerlengo, and Deller in Michigan.

Programs

With Chapplain

With Ali

Competitive highlights 
CS: Challenger Series; JGP: Junior Grand Prix

With Chapplain

With Ali

References

External links 

 

1997 births
Kazakhstani female ice dancers
Living people
Sportspeople from Almaty
Figure skaters at the 2012 Winter Youth Olympics
Competitors at the 2015 Winter Universiade
20th-century Kazakhstani women
21st-century Kazakhstani women